Pseudargyrotoza is a genus of moths belonging to the subfamily Tortricinae of the family Tortricidae.

Species
Pseudargyrotoza conwagana (Fabricius, 1775)
Pseudargyrotoza leucophracta (Meyrick in Caradja & Meyrick, 1937)

See also
List of Tortricidae genera

References

 , 1954: Die Gattungen der Palaearktischen Tortricidae I. Allgemeine Aufteilung der Familie und die Unterfamilien Tortricinae und Sparganothinae. Tijdschrift voor Entomologie 97 (3): 141–231.

External links
tortricidae.com

Cnephasiini
Tortricidae genera